Alonzo Lewis Mayes, Jr. (born June 4, 1975) is a former American college and professional football player who was a tight end in the National Football League (NFL) for three seasons.  He played college football for Oklahoma State University, and was recognized as an All-American.  Mayes played professionally for the NFL's Chicago Bears.

Early years
Mayes was born in Oklahoma City, Oklahoma.  He attended Frederick A. Douglass High School in Oklahoma City, where he played for the Douglass Trojans high school football team.

College career
Mayes received an athletic scholarship to attend Oklahoma State University and play for the Oklahoma State Cowboys football team from 1994 to 1997.  As a senior in 1997, he was recognized as a consensus first-team All-American at tight end.

Professional career
He finished his professional career with the Miami Dolphins, but never appeared in a regular season game for the Dolphins. In three NFL seasons with the Bears, Mayes played in thirty-seven games, started twenty-eight of them, and compiled thirty-three receptions for 339 yards and a touchdown. He was nicknamed "Showtime" for his zany celebrations.

References

1975 births
Living people
All-American college football players
American football tight ends
Chicago Bears players
Miami Dolphins players
Oklahoma State Cowboys football players
Players of American football from Oklahoma
Sportspeople from Oklahoma City